Lim Kok Leong is a Malaysian snooker player. He won the 2022 IBSF World Snooker Championship.

Career

Snooker
In May 2022 he was runner-up to James Wattana at the delayed 2021 Southeast Asian Games snooker tournament. His run to the final included a 4-0 semi-final win against Passakorn Suwanawat. He also won the Men's snooker 6-red singles at the same event. That win was reported to be on his 27th birthday, on 18 May, 2022, and included a 5-3 win the final against Jeffrey Roda of the Philippines.

In November 2022 he beat Amir Sarkhosh of Iran 5-0 in the final of the IBSF World Snooker Championship player in Antalya, Turkey. His run to the final included a 4-0 win over Eden Sharav. He became the first Malaysian snooker player to win the amateur title.

Doubles
He is a twice winner of the International Billiards and Snooker Federation (ISBF) World Team Championships. In 2015 Lim Kok Leong won the partnered with Moh Keen Hoo, in Karachi, Pakistan after a narrow 5-4 win in the final over home team Asjad Iqbal and Shahid Aftab. In 2019 he and Moh Keen Ho won gold at the Southeast Asian Games defeating Philippines’ Alvin Barberro and Jefrey Roda 3-1 in the best-of-5 final. In October 2022 he won the World Team Snooker Championship in Kuala Lumpur, again with Moh Keen Hoo. They beat Thai pair Kritsanut Lertsattayathorn-Jong and Rak Boonrod 4-2 in the final.

References

1995 births
Living people

Malaysian snooker players
Southeast Asian Games gold medalists for Malaysia
Southeast Asian Games silver medalists for Malaysia
Southeast Asian Games medalists in cue sports
Competitors at the 2021 Southeast Asian Games